Cycas elephantipes is a species of cycad. It is found only on a few high sandstone mesas in Nong Bua Rawe District, Chaiyaphum Province, northeastern Thailand. It is morphologically similar to Cycas pachypoda from southern Vietnam.

References

elephantipes
Endemic flora of Thailand